The Pickwick Corporation was a California corporation that historically encompassed a number of related businesses, including the surviving Pickwick Hotel in San Francisco, California.

History
Prior firms, merged to the Pickwick Corporation, had used the Pickwick Theatre, as their departure point. The company was named for its office location, the 1904  San Diego Pickwick Theater, built by Louis J. Wilde, primarily for vaudeville but converted to movies in 1922 and demolished in 1926.

Constituent companies

Pickwick Stage Lines
The Pickwick Stage Lines was one of the major bus companies incorporated into the  Greyhound system in its formative years.  Pickwick merged with Minnesota-based Northland Transportation in 1929 becoming Pickwick Greyhound.

Pickwick Motor Coach Works
Manufacturer of buses, including a unique sleeper coach called the "Nite Coach".  Pickwick's coach factory was located in  El Segundo, along what is now Aviation Blvd. just south of Imperial Blvd./Highway.  In 1934, this factory was acquired by the Northrup Division of the Douglas Aircraft Co., re-named the El Segundo Division of Douglas Aircraft after John Northrup left the Douglas Co. in 1937.  The building remained in use through World War II.

Pickwick Airways
Pickwick Airways operated a fleet of Bach 3-CT-6 "air yachts", initially between San Diego and Los Angeles, subsequently between San Francisco and Los Angeles, with service eventually extending as far as Mexico City. In 1929, Rena Vale was director of publicity. Gilpin Airlines emerged from the Depression-related failure of Pickwick Airways.

Pickwick Broadcasting
Pickwick Broadcasting was a network of radio stations in California, including KTAB in San Francisco (now KSFO), KNRC in Los Angeles, KTM (became KEHE, now KABC (AM)) in Santa Monica, and KGB (now KLSD) in San Diego.

Pickwick Hotels
  
In 1926, a Pickwick Hotel, was built by the company itself, and located in  Anaheim at 225 South Los Angeles (later Anaheim) Blvd.  It was initially named the El Torre but was re-named Pickwick in 1929.  It suffered some damage in the 1933 Long Beach earthquake, but was repaired.  It continued in use under new owners until it was demolished in 1988.

In 1927, the Pickwick Terminal Hotel, opened in San Diego. It was restored and re-named The Sofia Hotel in 2006.

On 22 September 1928, the Pickwick Hotel in San Francisco opened at Fifth and Mission near Union Square.  The same building was utilized by the Pickwick Stage Lines as its San Francisco terminal.  It was mentioned in the Dashiell Hammett mystery novel  “The Maltese Falcon”.  The hotel survives under different owners today.

In 1930, a large Pickwick Hotel and bus terminal was built by the company and opened in Kansas City.  It was restored in 2015 and re-opened as "East 9 at Pickwick Plaza" in 2016.

In 1930, Pickwick opened another hotel in Salt Lake City.

The Pickwick Hotel in Los Angeles was located at 833 South Grand, adjacent to the  Trinity Auditorium Building.  The site of the hotel is now a modern parking garage with the address 801 South Grand.

References

External links
 Pickwick Hotel website
 The Radio Historian - The Pickwick Stage Company
 Coachbuilt - Pickwick Motor Coach Works
 Cinema Treasures - The Pickwick Theater in San Diego
 Just A Car Guy, Blogspot - Photos of Pickwick buses
 Denver Post blog -Pickwick; includes photos of nite coach

Hotels in San Francisco
Pick
Defunct airlines of the United States
Defunct radio networks in the United States